Threet is an unincorporated community in Lauderdale County, in the U.S. state of Alabama.  A National Register of Historic Places-listed portion of the Natchez Trace, the Old Natchez Trace (310-2A), is located nearby.

References

Unincorporated communities in Lauderdale County, Alabama
Unincorporated communities in Alabama